The 1972 Cupa României Final was the 34th final of Romania's most prestigious football cup competition. It was disputed between Rapid București and Jiul Petroşani, and was won by Rapid București after a game with 2 goals. It was the 8th cup for Rapid București.

Match details

See also 
List of Cupa României finals

References

External links
Romaniansoccer.ro

1972
Cupa
Romania
FC Rapid București matches